The 1920 FA Charity Shield was a football match played on 15 May 1920 between the winners of the two divisions of the Football League in 1919–20. It was the seventh FA Charity Shield match and was contested by First Division champions West Bromwich Albion and Second Division champions Tottenham Hotspur. The match was played at Tottenham's home ground, White Hart Lane. Albion won 2–0 in what is their only outright Charity Shield victory to date (they shared the shield in 1954 after drawing with Wolverhampton Wanderers).

This was the first Charity Shield match since 1913; the competition had not taken place during the intervening period because of the First World War.

Match details

References

FA Community Shield
Charity Shield 1920
Charity Shield 1920
Comm
Charity Shield
Charity Shield